Whitehall High School may refer to:

Whitehall Senior High School, Whitehall, Michigan
Whitehall High School (Montana), Whitehall, Montana
Whitehall High School (Pennsylvania), Whitehall Township, Lehigh County, Pennsylvania
Whitehall High School (Wisconsin), Whitehall, Wisconsin
Whitehall-Yearling High School, Whitehall, Ohio
Whitehall Junior/Senior High School, Whitehall, New York
White Hall High School, White Hall, Arkansas